Guedes Lupapa (born 5 March 1988) is Angolan international footballer who plays as a striker. He played at the 2014 FIFA World Cup qualification.

International career

International goals
Scores and results list Angola's goal tally first.

References

1988 births
Living people
Angolan footballers
Angola international footballers
Association football forwards